Jušići may refer to:

 Jušići, Bosnia and Herzegovina, a village near Trebinje
 Jušići, Croatia, a village near Matulji